Bounty or bounties commonly refers to:
 Bounty (reward), an amount of money or other reward offered by an organization for a specific task done with a person or thing

Bounty or bounties may also refer to:

Geography
 Bounty, Saskatchewan, a ghost town located in Saskatchewan, Canada
 Bounty Bay, an embayment of the Pacific Ocean into Pitcairn Island, named for the ship
 Bounty Islands, a small group of 13 islets and numerous rocks in the south Pacific Ocean which are territorially part of New Zealand

Arts, entertainment, and media

Fictional entities
 Bounty, an evil entity that possessed and took over the identity of the DC Comics character Dawnstar
 Bounty, the name given by James T. Kirk's crew to their captured Bird-of-Prey in Star Trek IV: The Voyage Home

Music
 bounty (album), a 2013 album by iamamiwhoami
 "Bounty" (song), a 2013 song by Dean Brody

Films
 Bounty, a 1993 documentary film, the first Kinopanorama production shot in Australia
 The Bounty (1984 film), a film with Mel Gibson and Anthony Hopkins
 The Bounty (2012 film), a Hong Kong film

Television episodes
 "Bounty" (The A-Team)
 "Bounty" (Blake's 7)
 "Bounty" (Star Trek: Enterprise)
 "Bounty" (Stargate SG-1)
 "Bounty" (The Walking Dead)
 "The Bounty" (Wander Over Yonder), see List of Wander Over Yonder episodes (2014)
 "Bounty" (Star Trek: Picard), an episode of the third season of Star Trek: Picard

Other arts, entertainment, and media
 Bounty (Doctor Who audio), a Doctor Who audio production based on the television series
 Bounty (poker), a feature in some poker tournaments that rewards a player for eliminating another player

Brands and enterprises
 Bounty (brand), a brand of paper towel manufactured by Procter & Gamble
 Bounty (chocolate bar), a brand of coconut-filled chocolate bar

Ships
 Bounty (1960 ship), replica in the movie Mutiny on the Bounty with Marlon Brando; sunk in 2012 during Hurricane Sandy 
 Bounty (1978 ship), replica in the movie The Bounty with Mel Gibson
 , an 18th-century British Royal Navy ship

Other uses
 Bounty (parenting club), a UK parenting and pregnancy club
 Bounty, historically, another word for a "subsidy"
 Bounty Day, the national holiday of Norfolk Island, celebrated on Pitcairn Island on a different day, commemorating the ship

See also
 Bountiful (disambiguation)
 Bounty hunter (disambiguation)
 Mutiny on the Bounty (disambiguation)